Paraceratodus is an extinct genus of prehistoric lungfish. Only one species, P. germaini, is known from the latest Permian or earliest Triassic period of Madagascar. Phylogenetic evidence supports it being the most basal member of the suborder Ceratodontoidei, which contains modern lungfish, and as with the rest of the order it likely diverged during the late Carboniferous.

See also

 Sarcopterygii
 List of sarcopterygians
 List of prehistoric bony fish

References

Prehistoric lobe-finned fish genera